Bromeloecia is a genus of flies belonging to the family Lesser Dung flies.

Species
B. bromeliarum (Knab & Malloch, 1912)
B. seltzeri Marshall, 1983
B. tarsiglossa Marshall, 1983
B. winnemana (Malloch, 1925)

References

Sphaeroceridae
Diptera of North America
Diptera of South America
Sphaeroceroidea genera